Joseph-Désiré Court (14 September 1797, Rouen – 23 January 1865, Paris) was a French painter of historical subjects and portraits.

Life and work
He was a descendant of the portrait painter, Hyacinthe Rigaud, and displayed an early interest in art. Following that, he worked at the studios of Antoine-Jean Gros in Paris.

His allowance from his family was not quite enough for his needs, so he painted small pictures, which he sold through an agent. Despite this, he was unable to save enough money to continue his studies in Rome. Hoping that he could go at the expense of the state, he competed for the Prix de Rome and, in 1821, was awarded a prize for his depiction of Samson and Delilah. During his stay there, he continued to send works back to Paris for exhibition. His painting, "The Death of Caesar", was acquired by the Musée du Luxembourg in 1827.

In 1828, the Académie de Rouen named him a corresponding member, and commissioned a large painting for their new meeting room. Although their request was for an easel painting only, he produced a monumental canvas depicting the playwright Corneille, receiving honors from the nobility after the premiere of his tragedy, Cinna. Court was presented with a gold medal in gratitude.

Following the July Revolution, the government of King Louis-Philippe held a competition for a large canvas, to adorn the new room at the Chamber of Deputies. Three topics were offered. Court chose to paint Mirabeau facing Dreux-Brézé at the Estates General of 1789. His sketch came in second. Dissatisfied with the jury's decision, he executed the painting anyway; exhibiting it at the Salon in 1833. It may now be seen at the Musée des Beaux-Arts de Rouen. He did eventually receive some major public commissions, including figures for the Hôtel de Ville (1841), and paintings for the dome of Saint Isaac's Cathedral (1850). Much of his work was, however, devoted to portraiture.

He had long wanted to return to his hometown so, in 1853, he accepted an appointment as Conservator at the Musée de Rouen; immediately beginning a project to renovate the museum's rooms.

He succumbed to an unspecified chronic illness, while in Paris receiving treatment. His remains were taken home and interred at the Rouen Monumental Cemetery. He had been the recipient of numerous honors, including the Legion of Honor in 1838.

Gallery

References

Further reading
 Adolphe Decorde, Précis analytique des travaux de l’Académie des Sciences, Belles-lettres et Arts de Rouen, Rouen, H. Boissel,

External links

 « Joseph-Désiré Court » @ the Réunion des musées nationaux et du Grand Palais des Champs-Élysées.
 « Joseph-Désiré Court » @ the Base Joconde.

1797 births
1865 deaths
19th-century French painters
French male painters
French portrait painters
Artists from Rouen
Pupils of Antoine-Jean Gros
19th-century French male artists